Purgaz or Inäzor Purgaz (Purgas) was an Erzän leader in the first half of the 13th century. He was a Grand Duke (inäzor) of the Erzän Principality of Purgaz. Being an ally of Volga Bulgaria, he resisted easterly Slavic expansion of Suzdalian Rus forces into the region. In later times, he became a symbol of Erzän independence and a figure of legend.

Life
Purgaz was named in the Russian chronicles several times. In January, 1229 his army repulsed a raid of the Russian princes Yaroslav Vsevolodovich, Vasily Konstantinovich and Vsevolod Konstantinovich. Then Purgaz defeated the Mokshan prince, Puresh In April, 1229 he tried to regain Nizhny Novgorod from the hands of Zalesyean Rus', which was formerly the Erzyan settlement of Obran Osh. His troops burned down the settlement, but the citadel stayed safe. Several months later he was defeated by Puresh. During Purgaz's reign his land noted an influx of ruthenian slavic peasants into it.

In the summer of 1237, he successfully resisted the advance of the Mongols, he was defeated between the autumn of 1238 and the winter of 1239.

Later perception
Since the 13th century, Purgaz had been idolized as a mythical hero; he started to be erroneously called a King of Mordovia. In the following centuries, Purgaz continued to be seen as an Erzän hero.

Sources

See also
 Erzän Kiel
 Erzän Mastor

Volga Finns
History of Mordovia